Lead paint or lead-based paint is paint containing lead. As pigment, lead(II) chromate ("chrome yellow"), lead(II,IV) oxide, ("red lead"), and lead(II) carbonate ("white lead") are the most common forms. Lead is added to paint to accelerate drying, increase durability, maintain a fresh appearance, and resist moisture that causes corrosion. It is one of the main health and environmental hazards associated with paint. Lead paint has been generally phased out of use due to the toxic nature of lead. Alternatives such as water-based, lead-free traffic paint are readily available.

In some countries, lead continues to be added to paint intended for domestic use, whereas countries such as the United States and the United Kingdom have regulations prohibiting its use. However, lead paint may still be found in older properties painted prior to the introduction of such regulations. Although lead has been banned from household paints in the United States since 1978, it may still be found in road marking paint.

History
White lead was being produced during the 4th century BC; the process is described by Pliny the Elder, Vitruvius, and the ancient Greek author Theophrastus.

The traditional method of making the pigment was called the stack process. Hundreds or thousands of earthenware pots containing vinegar and lead were embedded in a layer of either tan bark or cow dung. The pots were designed so that the vinegar and lead were in separate compartments, but the lead was in contact with the vapor of the vinegar. The lead was usually coiled into a spiral and placed on a ledge inside the pot. The pot was loosely covered with a grid of lead, which allowed the carbon dioxide formed by the fermentation of the tan bark or the dung to circulate in the pot. Each layer of pots was covered by a new layer of tan, then another layer of pots. The heat created by the fermentation, acetic acid vapor, and carbon dioxide within the stack did their work, and within a month the lead coils were covered with a crust of white lead. This crust was separated from the lead, washed, and ground for pigment. This was an extremely dangerous process for the workmen. Medieval texts warned of the danger of "apoplexy, epilepsy, and paralysis" from working with lead white.

In 1786, Benjamin Franklin wrote a letter warning a friend about the hazards of lead and lead paint, which he considered well-established. Despite the risks, the pigment was very popular with artists because of its density and opacity; a small amount could cover a large surface. It was widely used by artists until the 19th century, when it was replaced by zinc white and titanium white.

The dangers of lead paint were considered well-established by the beginning of the 20th century. In the July 1904 edition of its monthly publication, Sherwin-Williams reported the dangers of paint containing lead, noting that a French expert had deemed lead paint "poisonous in a large degree, both for the workmen and for the inhabitants of a house painted with lead colors". As early as 1886, German health laws prohibited women and children from working in factories processing lead paint and lead sugar.

The League of Nations began efforts to ban lead paint in 1921.

Toxicity

Lead paint is hazardous. It can cause nervous system damage, stunted growth, kidney damage, and delayed development. It is associated with high violent crime rates. It is dangerous to children because it tastes sweet, therefore encouraging children to put lead chips and toys with lead dust in their mouths. Lead paint can cause reproductive problems, including a decrease in sperm concentration in men. Lead is also considered a likely carcinogen. High levels of exposure can be lethal.

Regulation

Canada
In Canada, regulations were first enacted under the Hazardous Products Act in 1976 that limited lead content of paints and other liquid coatings on furniture, household products, children's products, and exterior and interior surfaces of any building frequented by children to 0.5% by weight. New regulations on surface coating materials, which came into force in 2005, further limit lead to its background level for both interior and exterior paints sold to consumers. Canadian paint manufacturers have been conforming to this background level in their interior and exterior consumer paints since 1991. Nevertheless, a Canadian company, Dominion Colour Corporation, is "the largest manufacturer of lead-based paint pigments in the world" and has faced public criticism for obtaining permission from the European Chemicals Agency to continue to export lead chromate paints from its Dutch subsidiary to countries where its uses are not tightly regulated.

China
New regulation effective from December 1, 2020
updates an older lead paint standard introduced in the 1980’s, which measured “soluble lead” in products instead of “total lead.” Measuring “soluble” lead is considered to be a less accurate method for measuring the amount of lead paint exposure in children. The new standards set a 90 ppm total lead limit for woodware coatings and architectural wall coatings. For vehicle and industrial coatings the new total lead limit is 1,000 ppm.

European Union
Lead paint is banned in the European Union by the 2003 Restriction of Hazardous Substances Directive (RoHS), which forbids hazardous substances in consumer goods, including paint. This act superseded and harmonized existing laws of the member states, many of which had banned lead paint years before.

To protect the health of painters, France had passed in 1909 a law banning the use of paints containing lead for the painting of the interior and exterior of all buildings.

Hong Kong
, there are no regulation and legislation on lead content in paints.

India
Lead paint was not prohibited in India until 2016. A 2015 study found that over 31% of household paints in India (small brands manufactured by small and medium enterprises in India, with limited local reach and distribution) had lead concentration above 10,000 parts per million (ppm), which far exceeds the BIS standard of 90 ppm for lead in paint. The Regulation on Lead Contents in Household and Decorative Paint Rules came into effect on 1 November 2017, according to which the paints should have lead less than 90 ppm and their label should say so. However, two years later, an analysis of 32 locally-manufactured paint samples from nine states found lead content ranging from 10 ppm to 186,062 ppm, with 90% of samples having lead levels above 90 ppm.

Philippines
The Philippines banned lead paint in 2013, but in 2017, 15% of the paint still was not certified. The EcoWaste Coalition and the Philippine Association of Paint Manufacturers declared on 1 January 2020 that the Philippines has phased-out lead paint following the implementation of Department of Environment and Natural Resources (DENR) Administrative Order 2013–24, or the Chemical Control Order for Lead and Lead Compounds, which directed manufacturers of lead-containing paints for industrial uses to phase out such paints by 31 December 2019.

Singapore
Since 1 Feb 1995, labelling is required for paints with total lead concentrations exceeding 600 ppm. From 3 Jan 2022, the manufacture, import and sale of paints exceeding 90ppm total lead concentration for local use were banned, except for zinc-based anti-corrosion paints and copper-based anti-fouling paints. For export and re-export a Hazardous Substance Licence is required (
except for zinc-based anti-corrosion paints and copper-based anti-fouling paints). For local sale of zinc-based anti-corrosion paints and copper-based anti-fouling paints exceeding 90ppm total lead concentration labelling is required and only industrial uses are allowed.

South Africa
In South Africa, the Hazardous Substances Act of 2009 classifies lead as a hazardous substance and limits its use in paint to 600 parts per million (ppm). A proposed amendment will modify this to 90 ppm, thereby almost completely eradicating lead from paint. The amendment would also include all industrial paints, which were previously excluded.

United Kingdom

Lead paint was banned in the United Kingdom in 1992.

United States

The U.S. Consumer Product Safety Commission (CPSC) banned lead paint in 1977 in residential properties and public buildings (16 CFR 1303), along with toys and furniture containing lead paint. The cited reason was "to reduce the risk of lead poisoning in children who may ingest paint chips or peelings". For manufacturers, the CPSC instituted the Consumer Product Safety Improvement Act of 2008, which changed the cap on lead content in paint from 0.06% to 0.009% starting 14 August 2009. In 2018 the State of Delaware banned the use of lead paint on outdoor structures. Also, the Residential Lead-Based Paint Hazard Reduction Act ( the "Lead Paint Act") was created in order to ensure that the disclosure of any lead-based hazards in a building be discussed with potential buyers or renters of units. While EPA and HUD have defined LBP as being 1.0 mg/cm2 (as measure by XRF) or 0.5% lead by dry weight (aka 5,000 ppm), some states and municipalities gone beyond this. For example, New York City's Local Law 66 of 2019 defines LBP as 0.500 mg/cm2 (XRF) or 0.25% lead dry weight (2,500 ppm). 

EPA's Lead Renovation, Repair and Painting Rule (RRP Rule) lowers the risk of lead contamination from home renovation activities. It requires that firms performing renovation, repair, and painting projects that disturb lead-based paint in homes, child care facilities and pre-schools (any child occupied facility) built before 1978 be certified by EPA and use certified renovators who are trained by EPA-approved training providers to follow lead-safe work practices.

, there are an estimated 37 million homes and apartments with lead paint in the United States.

Lead paint in art

Oil paints
In art, white lead paint is known as "flake white" or "Cremnitz white". It is valued for the ease of handling and resilience the lead confers to oil paints. Lead white paint dries relatively quickly to form a strong, flexible paint film. Lead-based white is one of the oldest manufactured pigments. It was the only white pigment available to artists in appreciable quantities until the twentieth century, when zinc white and titanium white became available. Industrially produced lead white, the typical pigment from the 19th century until its ban, was thought to be inferior to traditionally fabricated forms, which had larger "flake" particles that conferred ease of handling.

Titanium and zinc whites are far less toxic than lead white and have largely supplanted it in most fine arts applications. Safety regulations have also made lead white more expensive and difficult to obtain in some regions, such as the EU. Lead white oil paints are still produced and in use by artists who prefer their unique handling, mixing, and structural qualities. Lead white has also shown to have extended longevity compared to zinc and titanium which will to crack much earlier. 

Flake white has various drawbacks, including a tendency to become transparent over time. It also blackens in the presence of certain atmospheric pollutants, although this can be reversed.

Water-based paints
Lead is not a traditional pigment in water media, as zinc is superior for works on paper, as is calcium hydroxide (slaked lime) for frescos. Lead-based paints, when used on paper, often cause the work to become discolored after long periods; the paint's lead carbonate reacts with hydrogen sulfide in the air and with acids, which often come from fingerprints.

Substitutes

Titanium
Paint manufacturers have replaced white lead with a less toxic substitute, titanium dioxide, which was first used in paints in the 19th century. Titanium dioxide is considered safe enough to use as a food coloring and in toothpaste, and is a common ingredient in sunscreen. Titanium white has far greater opacity and tinting strength than lead white, and it can easily overpower most other pigments if not mixed carefully. Titanium white has been criticized for leading to "chalkiness" in mixtures.

Zinc
Zinc white is less opaque and weaker in tinting strength than either titanium white or lead white. It is commonly used to lighten mixtures subtly while maintaining transparency. Although zinc white is the standard white in watercolors, its structural soundness in oils has been debated. Zinc white dries slowly and creates a relatively inflexible paint film. Critics of the pigment argue that its use leads to excessive cracking and delamination, even when used sparingly.

See also
 Environmental issues with paint
 Lead-based paint in the United Kingdom
 Lead-based paint in the United States
 Lead tetroxide
 Lead–crime hypothesis
Lead abatement

References

Bibliography

External links 
 EPA guide to lead safety
 National Pollutant Inventory (Australia) – Lead and lead compounds fact sheet
 National Survey of Lead and Allergens in Housing 
 Annotated bibliography of works on paint and color
 Myths concerning lead paint

Toxicology
Lead
Paints
Environmental impact of paint